Madison Masonic Temple may refer to:

Madison Masonic Temple (Madison, South Dakota)
Madison Masonic Temple (Madison, Wisconsin)